Billinge may refer to:

England
Billinge, Merseyside in the Metropolitan Borough of St Helens
Billinge Higher End in the Metropolitan Borough of Wigan, Greater Manchester
Billinge and Winstanley Urban District, a former parish and urban district
Billinge Hill, the county top (highest point) of Merseyside
Billinge Scar, now demolished 19th century country house near Blackburn, Lancashire.

Sweden
Billinge, Sweden in Eslöv Municipality, Skåne County

See also
Billing (disambiguation)
Billings (disambiguation)